Listen is an album by Tim Bowman Jr., released on May 6, 2016. It reached a peak position of number one on Billboard Top Gospel Albums chart, and earned Bowman a Grammy Award nomination for Best Gospel Album.

Track listing
 "Listen (Morning)" - 0:48
 "Everybody Needs Love" (feat. BrvndoP) – 4:11
 "Always on Time" – 3:13
 "I'm Good" – 3:44
 "Strength" – 3:41
 "Back to You" – 3:53
 "Listen (Evening)" – 0:43
 "Your Love" – 4:55
 "Always" – 4:34
 "Home" – 3:38
 "Without You" – 4:12
 "Better" – 4:04
 "I Won" – 3:41
 "Fix Me" – 4:40
 "Good Good Father" – 5:42

Track listing adapted from iTunes.

References

2016 albums
Tim Bowman Jr. albums